Dave Evans (August 31, 1898 – March 31, 1974) was an American racing driver. 

Evans was born in Los Angeles, California. In 1931, he performed a remarkable feat when his Cummins Diesel Special completed the entire Indy 500 without a pit stop. He died in  Dell, Montana, aged 75.

Indy 500 results

Notes

1898 births
1974 deaths
Indianapolis 500 drivers
Racing drivers from Los Angeles